is a Japanese politician of the Democratic Party of Japan. He is a member of the House of Representatives in the Diet (national legislature). A native of Nagoya, Aichi and drop-out of Sophia University, he was elected to the House of Representatives for the first time in 2000.

References

External links 
 Official website in Japanese.

Members of the House of Representatives from Aichi Prefecture
Sophia University alumni
Living people
1958 births
People from Nagoya
Democratic Party of Japan politicians
21st-century Japanese politicians